James John Wedderburn Scott (26 December 1927 – March 2020) was a Scottish footballer who played for Dumbarton, Alloa Athletic and Workington.

References

1927 births
2020 deaths
Scottish footballers
Dumbarton F.C. players
Alloa Athletic F.C. players
Scottish Football League players
Workington A.F.C. players
English Football League players
Association football inside forwards
Footballers from Glasgow